Buddie Joe "B. J." Penn (born April 2, 1938) was the Assistant Secretary of the Navy (Installation and Environment) in the United States Department of the Navy from 2005 to 2009.  He briefly served as acting United States Secretary of the Navy from March 13, 2009 to May 19, 2009.

Biography

B. J. Penn was born in 1938 in Peru, Indiana and was educated at Purdue University (B.S.) and George Washington University (M.S.).  He would later also acquire a certificate in Aerospace Safety from the University of Southern California and a certificate in National Security for Senior Officials from the John F. Kennedy School of Government.  He is also a member of Alpha Phi Alpha fraternity and an Eagle Scout within the Boy Scouts of America.

Penn began his career in the United States Navy as a United States Naval Aviator, ultimately amassing 6500 hours of flight time in sixteen different aircraft.  He was named the Navy's EA-6B Prowler Replacement Training Squadron Student Pilot of the Year in 1972.  He went on to serve as the Executive Officer / Commanding Officer of VAQ 33 within the Fleet Electronic Warfare Support Group; as Battalion Officer at the United States Naval Academy (including serving as Officer-in-Charge of the Plebe Detail for the class of 1983); as Air Officer on the USS America (CV-66); as special assistant to the Chief of Naval Operations; as Commanding Officer of Naval Air Station North Island; and as Deputy Director of the Navy Office of Technology Transfer & Security Assistance.

Penn left the Navy for the private sector in 1995, joining Loral Corporation as Director of International Business; his work at Loral focused on airborne Electronic Warfare and Defensive Electronic Counter Measure Systems.  In 1996, Loral sold its defense electronics and system integration businesses to Lockheed Martin and Penn was assigned to Lockheed Martin's Corporate Staff responsible for developing markets in Central and Eastern Europe.  In 1998, he transferred to the Lockheed Martin's Naval Electronics and Surveillance Systems working Advanced Programs; there he focused on Interoperability CONOPS for the Joint Strike Fighter Program, on upgrading the technology used in the F-16 Fighting Falcon, on efforts to develop Unmanned Aerial Vehicles and Autonomous Undersea Vehicles, and on C4ISR initiatives.

Penn returned to the U.S. Navy in October 2001 as Director of Industrial Base Assessments.  In this capacity, he was responsible for the Navy's industrial base, i.e. for ensuring that defense contractors had sufficient capacity and capabilities to meet the Navy's ongoing needs for national defense.

President of the United States George W. Bush named Penn Assistant Secretary of the Navy (Installation and Environment), and Penn assumed this post on March 1, 2005.

Under President Barack Obama, he briefly served as acting United States Secretary of the Navy from March 13, 2009 to May 19, 2009.

He currently serves as an advisor and director including on the board of Lone Star Analysis.

References

External links

Biography at the U.S. Navy website (archived snapshot 2012-10-09)
Presidential Nomination: Buddie Joe Penn

|-

1938 births
George W. Bush administration personnel
Obama administration personnel
George Washington University alumni
Living people
People from Peru, Indiana
Purdue University alumni
United States Naval Aviators
United States Secretaries of the Navy